Dazed and Confused may refer to:

Music
 "Dazed and Confused" (song), a 1967 song by Jake Holmes, popularized by Led Zeppelin
 "Dazed & Confused" (Ruel song), 2018
 Dazed and Confused, a 2014 EP by Jake Miller, and its title song

Other media
 Dazed and Confused (film), a 1993 film by Richard Linklater
 Dazed, a British style magazine formerly called Dazed & Confused

See also
 Daze (disambiguation)